{{Infobox person
| name          = Milo Parker
| image         = 
| alt           = 
| caption       = 
| birth_date    = 
| birth_place   = 
| nationality   = British
| other_names   = 
| occupation    = Actor
| years_active  = 2014–present
| known_for     = Mr. Holmes, The Durrells and Miss Peregrine's Home for Peculiar Children
| notable_works =
}}
Milo Parker is a British actor. He is known for his roles as Connor in Robot Overlords, Roger Munro in Mr. Holmes, Hugh Apiston in Miss Peregrine's Home for Peculiar Children and Gerry Durrell in ITV's The Durrells.

Life and work
Parker trained at Youngblood Theatre Company and made his feature film debut in the British independent science fiction film Robot Overlords, before starring alongside Ian McKellen in Mr. Holmes'', for which he earned nominations for the Critics' Choice Movie Award for Best Young Performer and 42nd Saturn Awards for Best Performance by a Younger Actor. In an interview for The Lady, McKellen praised his young co-star, saying "Milo was full of the esprit of a young person. He had no fear of the camera or of doing exactly what the director wanted when required.".
He attended Farlingaye High School in Woodbridge, Suffolk. Parker has one older brother, Jacob (born in 2001), and one younger sister, Amelie (born in 2005). His brother died as an infant.

Filmography

Film

Television

Audio

Awards and nominations

References

External links

Living people
21st-century English male actors
English male child actors
English male film actors
English male television actors
Male actors from Suffolk
Actors from Ipswich
Year of birth missing (living people)